Israeli Ambassadors to the United Nations (New York), United Nations (Geneva), IAEA & CTBTO Prepcom (Vienna), OECD (Paris), OECD & UNESCO (Paris), NATO (Brussels), United Nations & OSCE (Vienna), CARICOM (Georgetown), and FAO, WFP & IFAD (Rome)

Ambassadors to CARICOM
Itai Bardov 2021-
Reda Mansour 2018-2021
Mordehai Amihai-Bivas 2015 - 2018 
Amiram Magid 2013 - 2015

Ambassadors to FAO, WFP & IFAD
Ofer Sachs 2016 - (concurrently ambassador to  Italy, San Marino)
Ehud Gol 2002 - 2006

Ambassadors to IAEA & CTBTO Prepcom

Merav Zafary-Odiz 2013 - 
Ehud Azulay 2009 - 2013
Israel Michaeli 2004 - 2009
Gabriella Gafni 2001 - 2004
Giyora Amir 1996 - 2001
Yosef Altar 1991 - 1996
Minister Ran Marom 1988 - 1991
Minister David Ranen 1985 - 1988
Minister Shalom Katz 1981 - 1985
Minister Ephraim Tari 1978 - 1981
Minister Ehud Avivi 1975 - 1978
Minister Yehuda Eden 1971 - 1975
Minister Michael Doron 1968 - 1971
Minister Naftali Shimron 1963 - 1968
Minister Itzhak Keenan 1959 - 1963
Ambassador Yeheskel Sahar 1959
Minister Moshe Dak 1958
Minister Shmuel Bentsur 1957

Ambassadors to NATO
Haim Regev 2021- 
Aharon Leshno-Yaar 2016 -

Ambassadors to OECD
Eli Emanuel Lev 2018 -
Meir Shamir (diplomat) 1983 - 1986

Ambassadors to OECD and UNESCO

Carmel Shama Hacohen 2014 - 2018
Nimrod Barkan 2010 - 2014
Yael Vered 1979 - 1983
Mordechay Avida 1972 - 1974
Moshe Avidor 1968 - 1971
Mordechay Avida 1966 - 1968

Ambassadors to the United Nations (Geneva)
Aviva Raz Shechter 2016 - 
Eviatar Manor 2012 - 2016
Aharon Leshno-Yaar 2008 - 2012
Itzhak Levanon 2004 - 2008
Yaakov Levy 2000 - 2004
David Peleg 1998 - 2000
Nevill-Yosef Lamdan 1994 - 1998
Yithak Leor 1990 - 1994
Ephraim Dowek 1983 - 1986
Ovadia Sofer 1981 - 1983
Joel Baromi 1977 - 1981
Eitan Ron 1974 - 1977
Gideon Rafael 1965 - 1966
Moshe Bartur 1961 - 1965
Menachem Kahany 1955 - 1956

Ambassadors to the United Nations in New York
See Permanent Representative of Israel to the United Nations

Ambassadors to the United Nations & OSCE (Vienna)
Talya Lador-Fresher 2015- 
Zvi Heifetz 2013 - 2015
Aviv Shir-On 2009 - 2013
Dan Ashbel 2005 - 2009
Avraham Toledo 2004 (Charge d'Affaires a.i. 2001 - 2004)
Charge d'Affaires a.i. Ilan Ben-Dov (diplomat) 2000 - 2001
Nathan Meron 1998 - 2000
Yoel Sher 1995 - 1998
Yosef Govrin 1990 - 1993
Charge d'Affaires a.i. Gideon Yarden 1986 - 1990
Michel Elizur 1984 - 1986
Issaschar Ben-Yaacov 1979 - 1983
Yaacov Doron 1977 - 1979
Avigdor Dagan 1974 - 1977
Yitzhak Patish 1971 - 1974
Zeev Shek 1967 - 1971
Michael Simon (diplomat) 1963 - 1967
Nathan Peled 1961 - 1963
Yehezkil Sahar 1958 - 1960

References

International Organizations